Frater Albertus Spagyricus (Albert Richard Riedel) born May 5,(1911–1984); founder of the Paracelsus Research Society in Salt Lake City, which later evolved into the Paracelsus College.  Based on the Paracelsian concept of three essentials, Body, Soul and Spirit, Frater Albertus developed a system of teaching alchemical concepts using the spagyric technique of separation and cohobation.  The unique graduated courses allowed students to explore aspects of the vegetable, mineral and animal kingdoms in an understandable and accessible way. After his death in 1984, the college ceased operations in the United States but continued to carry on the tradition in Australia.  Frater Albertus had a profound effect on the way Alchemy and particularly the Spagyric method was disseminated and understood in the mid to late 20th century.  His works were translated into many languages. He was a rosicrucian (an AMORC member).

Written works 
 Drei Novellen 1932
 Dachstubenverse eines Ausgewanderten (Attic Poems of an Emigrant) 
 The Alchemist's Handbook 1960
 From One to Ten 1966 
 Praxis Spagyrica Philosophia (Leipzig, 1711) (1966 PRS limited ed. 500 copies) 1998 Weiser with From One to Ten
 The Seven Rays of the QBL (1st. Ed. 1981.) 1985 Weiser
 Praktische Alchemie im Zwanzigsten Jahrhundert 1970 PRS (German) 
 Men and Cycles of the Universe 1970
 The Alchemist of the Rocky Mountains 1976 PRS (limited edition 500 copies) 
 Gently I Answered and Said 1978 PRS  (limited edition 500 copies)
 Book on Antimony (only mention)

Associated works 
 Parachemy 1973–1979 
 Parachemica 1976 - 1980 P.R.S. (Aust.) 
 Essentia 1980 - 1984
 AMO 1983 Paracelsus College; First English translation from German by Robert Firmage; introduction by Frater Albertus 
 Golden Manuscripts 1973-74 Para Publishers

Translations (provisional list)
German

Praktische Alchemie im Zwanzigsten Jahrhundert 1970 PRS
Der Mensch und die kosmischen Zyklen 1971
Von Eins bis Zehn 1972
Der Alchemist aus den Rocky Mountains 1980
Die Sieben Strahlen der Q.B.L. 1973
Sanft antwortete ich und sprach... 1979

French

Le Manuel de l'Alchimiste translator Denis Claing; Les Ateliers du MAAT/ L.P.N

Spanish

Manual del Alquimista 1980
El Hombre y los Ciclos del Universo

Italian

Manuale dell’Alchimista 1978 Astrolabio

Czech
Príručka alchymisty 2000
Praxis spagyrica philosophica & Od jedné do deseti 2000

External links
Paracelsus College
Ancient Mystical Order Rosae-Crucis

1911 births
1984 deaths
20th-century alchemists
20th-century American educators
American alchemists